L'île Sainte-Marie (English: Sainte-Marie Island) is a river island of the Richelieu River. It is located in the territory of the municipality of Carignan, in the La Vallée-du-Richelieu Regional County Municipality, in the administrative region from Montérégie, in the south of province of Quebec, to Canada.

Île Sainte-Marie is located downstream from Sainte-Thérèse Island, from which it is separated by a narrow channel.

Geography 
It is connected to the left bank of the Richelieu River by a road which passes over the pier forming the right bank of the Chambly Canal.

History 
Quebec historians generally locate the old fort Sainte Thérèse, which has disappeared today, opposite Île Sainte-Marie.

Toponymy 
The name of island comes from that of a former owner, Jean Sainte-Marie.

The toponym "Île Sainte-Marie" was formalized on December 5, 1968 at the Place Names Bank of the Commission de toponymie du Québec.

Occupation 
Formerly an agricultural territory, Île Sainte-Marie is now occupied by around thirty residences. The "Rue de l'Île-Sainte-Marie" is the main road on the island.

Notes and references 

River islands of Quebec
River islands
La Vallée-du-Richelieu Regional County Municipality